Wang Feifan (born 4 December 1958) is a Chinese speed skater. He competed in the men's 1000 metres event at the 1984 Winter Olympics.

References

1958 births
Living people
Chinese male speed skaters
Olympic speed skaters of China
Speed skaters at the 1984 Winter Olympics
Place of birth missing (living people)
20th-century Chinese people